The Yamaha Ténéré 700 is a midsize adventure/dual-sport motorcycle manufactured by Yamaha since 2019. It features a   parallel-twin engine which powers the motorcycle through a six-speed gearbox and chain drive. Brakes are equipped with rider-switchable (on-off) ABS.

History and development 
The "baby Ténéré" is the latest in a series of dual-sport Yamaha motorcycles named after the Ténéré desert stage of the Dakar Rally in the Sahara. The successor to Yamaha's XT660Z Ténéré was first announced as the T7 concept at the 2016 EICMA with an anticipated production launch in 2018. A refined concept was publicized a year later.

Yamaha announced that delivery of bikes would begin in Europe in July 2019, and only the following year to the USA due to emissions and other regulatory delays.
The  liquid-cooled 4-stroke 8-valve DOHC engine with crossplane crankshaft was already in use and well reviewed in Yamaha's MT-07 naked and Tracer 700 sport touring bikes.

References

External links 

Ténéré 700
Dual-sport motorcycles
Motorcycles introduced in 2019
Motorcycles powered by straight-twin engines